New Britain is the sixth album by Whitehouse released in 1982 by Come Organisation. Much like its title, interior artwork, and lyrical themes suggest, the album mostly deals with the subject of fascism. The album was initially released on vinyl formats, limited to only 500 copies. It was reissued on compact disc in 1996 through Susan Lawly.

Track listing
"Movement 1982" – 3:46
"Roman Strength" – 3:53
"Will to Power" – 3:43
"New Britain" – 3:52
"Ravensbruck" – 3:56
"Kriegserklärung" – 3:56
"Viking Section" – 3:56
"Active Force" – 3:19

Personnel
 William Bennett – synthesizers, production
 Peter McKay – production
 George Peckham – mastering (original release)
 Denis Blackham – mastering (reissue)
 Atholl Drummond – artwork (reissue)

References

External links 
New Britain at Susan Lawly
Whitehouse 1981-1982 recording dossier at Susan Lawly

Whitehouse (band) albums
1982 albums